Laila Kaland (8 January 1939 – 30 December 2007) was a Norwegian politician for the Labour Party. She was born in Gloppen.

She was elected to the Norwegian Parliament from Møre og Romsdal in 1985, and was re-elected on three occasions. She had previously served in the position of deputy representative during the terms 1981–1985.

Kaland was a member of Sykkylven municipality council between 1975 and 1985, and of Møre og Romsdal county council between 1979 and 1985.

References

1939 births
2007 deaths
Labour Party (Norway) politicians
Members of the Storting
Women members of the Storting
People from Gloppen
People from Sykkylven
21st-century Norwegian politicians
21st-century Norwegian women politicians
20th-century Norwegian women politicians
20th-century Norwegian politicians